Wu Ta-k'uei or Wu Dakui (1923–1972) was a Chinese Wu-style t'ai chi ch'uan teacher of Manchu ancestry.

Biography
The oldest son of Wu Kung-i, he was born in Beijing, raised in Shanghai (where he was first taught t'ai chi ch'uan by his grandfather, Wu Chien-ch'uan) and spent most of his adult life teaching in Hong Kong.
 Wu Ta-k'uei was active in the resistance to the Japanese invasion of China, yet he later taught martial arts in Japan after the war.

Wu Ta-k'uei was reputed to be a fierce fighter, and known as always ready to accept a challenge match. He is reported to have never been defeated, and to have been famous for badly injuring and taunting his opponents in those matches. An attested story circulated about Wu Ta-k'uei was about a fight that  started in a Hong Kong dockside bar between an unarmed Wu Ta-k'uei and "over 30" stevedores armed with clubs and boathooks. The dockworkers eventually fled to a local police station for protection from the enraged Wu. Interviews with dockworkers and the police records of this fight led to sensational newspaper headlines in Kowloon and Hong Kong.

Wu Ta-k'uei assisted his father and his uncle Wu Kung-tsao to set up academies in Hong Kong, Macau and Singapore. He also sat on the Advisory Board of the Martial Art Association in Hong Kong and taught martial arts in the Kowloon Police Force.

His oldest son, Eddie Wu Kuang-yu, is the current "gate-keeper" of the Wu family.

Generational senior instructors of the Wu family
1st Generation
Wu Ch'uan-yu (Wu Quanyou, 吳全佑, 1834–1902), who learned from Yang Luchan and Yang Pan-hou, was senior instructor of the family from 1870-1902.

2nd generation
His oldest son, Wu Chien-ch'uan (Wu Jianquan, 吳鑑泉, 1870–1942), was senior from 1902-1942.

3rd Generation
His oldest son, Wu Kung-i (Wu Gongyi, 吳公儀, 1900–1970) was senior from 1942-1970.
Wu Kung-i's younger brother, Wu Kung-tsao (Wu Gongzao, 吳公藻, 1903–1983), was senior from 1970-1983.
Wu Kung-i's younger sister, Wu Ying-hua (Wu Yinghua, 吳英華, 1907–1997), was senior from 1983-1997.

4th Generation
Wu Kung-i's daughter, Wu Yen-hsia (Wu Yanxia, 吳雁霞, 1930–2001) was senior from 1997-2001.
Wu Kung-tsao's son, Wu Ta-hsin (Wu Daxin, 吳大新, 1933–2005), was senior from 2001-2005.

5th Generation
The current senior instructor of the Wu family is Wu Ta-k'uei's son Wu Kuang-yu (Wu Guangyu, Eddie Wu, 吳光宇, born 1946).

T'ai chi ch'uan lineage tree with Wu-style focus

See also
 108 form Wu family T'ai Chi Ch'uan

External links
 Wu Ta-k’uei demonstrating t’ai chi sword form, throws and freestyle applications

References

1923 births
1972 deaths
Manchu martial artists
Tai chi practitioners from Shanghai
Chinese emigrants to British Hong Kong